Christian Hauser (born 13 January 1976, in Gera) is a German former footballer who played as a midfielder.

Career 
Hauser began his career with BSG Metall Gera and moved in summer 1986 to city rival Wismut Gera. After only one year with Wismut Gera was scouted from FC Carl Zeiss Jena. Hauser played for many years for FC Carl Zeiss Jena, before moving to Bayern Munich II in 2002. After two years with Bayern's reserves, he returned north, joining Dynamo Dresden. He left Dynamo in 2008 to join 1. FC Gera and signed on 20 May 2009 a contract with his former club FC Carl Zeiss Jena. After one year who earned 27 caps and scored two goals for FC Carl Zeiss Jena II left in summer 2010 the club to sign for FSV Zwickau. He retired in 2012.

References

External links
 

1976 births
Living people
German footballers
Association football midfielders
FC Bayern Munich II players
FC Carl Zeiss Jena players
Dynamo Dresden players
FSV Zwickau players
2. Bundesliga players
1. FC Gera 03 players
Sportspeople from Gera
Footballers from Thuringia